The South Bay Phalanx was a Fourierist community that was founded during early 1844 in Western New York alongside Lake Ontario. South Bay Phalanx was one of several Fourier-based communities that began in the United States. The location was that of an abandoned Shaker Community, which gave them a significant advantage in starting a utopian community. The land included a variety of fruit trees, a saw mill, community and residential buildings.

However, despite this advantage, the community eventually disbanded due to significant financial trouble. The financial trouble was caused by an influx of new residents from the Erie Canal area experiencing financial hardship, as well as the overly generous return on investment to residents. The large number of residents, many of which were characterized as lazy, only added to the quick spread of typhoid fever in 1844. The final crack in the society occurred when "evangelical Protestants and religious liberals" fought over the educational methods and curriculum. In April 1846, the remaining thirteen members officially dissolved the community, which at its height had over 264 members.

References
The Utopian Alternative: Fourierism in Nineteenth-Century America By Carl J. Guarneri

Utopian communities in the United States